Harmologa festiva is a species of moth of the family Tortricidae. It is found in New Zealand.

The wingspan is about 16 mm. The forewings are bright ochreous red with white fasciae. The hindwings are fuscous. Adults males were found amongst Veronica and other shrubs in January.

References

Moths described in 1915
Archipini